Jaime Alexis Peña Molina better known as Alexis Peña (born 2 February 1984) is a Colombian Christian music, singer, songwriter, worship leader, pastor, author, teacher, and speaker known for combining practical biblical principles with the flow of prophetic songs. Alexis plays contemporary worship music for a Latin music audience.

Early and personal life

Alexis Peña was born in Piedecuesta, Santander in 1984.

He is the youngest brother of five children and he grew up in a dysfunctional home. When he was 12 years old he left his home and became a drug addict and an alcoholic. At the age of 18, he met Jesus in a local church and left drugs and alcohol to devote himself to writing songs and singing to God. At age 20, he married Nancy Peña with whom he has a son Angel Alexis Peña.

Peña wrote his first worship song at age eighteen. In the mid-2000s, Alexis was a worship leader at the Confraternidad Cristiana Internacional (International Christian Confraternity) in Piedecuesta.

He was ordained as the principal pastor of Casa de adoracion (House of Worship) in Piedecuesta in 2011 and founded the school of worshipers Adoracion Genuina (Genuine worship). He was sent as a missionary to the city of Maracaibo, Venezuela in 2017.

Career
Alexis Peña is the principal pastor in the Casa de adoracion (House of Worship) in Piedecuesta, Colombia. Additionally, he is the founder and leader of the school of worshipers Adoracion genuina (Genuine Worship).

He began his musical career in 2002 as part of a Christian rock band, Si previo aviso (Unannounced).

Peña recorded his first album in 2010, Abriste mis ojos (Open my eyes), which was followed by an international tour. He was ordained as the principal pastor in Casa de adoracion (House of worship) in Piedecuesta in 2011.

He recorded El sacrificio de tu amor (The sacrifice of your love) in 2015. It sold well in Latin American countries like Venezuela, Ecuador, Peru, Panama and his native Colombia in the tour El sacrificio de tu amor, in 2016 with this same album is nominated as best Latin song of the year in the AMCL awards.

In 2016, he recorded Yo te prometo (I promise you), which includes duets with different Latin American musicians from Venezuela, Ecuador, Peru, Panama, Dominican Republic and Colombia. The album was nominated for several Latin American music awards. Peña was sent as a missionary to Venezuela in 2017.

Discography 
 Abriste mis ojos (2010)
 El sacrificio de tu amor (2015)
 Yo te prometo (2016)
 "Resucitame" featuring Aline Barros (2016) single Smule
 Vida hecha canción (2017) 
 El tiempo llego (2018) 
 Tu rareza (2019) 
 Direccionados (2019) featuring Alex Márquez & The maestro
 Muestrame tu gloria (2020) 
 Aleluya - Hallelujah (Versión Cuarentena) Featuring various artists (2020) 
 El Dios que tengo yo (Versión Cuarentena) Featuring Isaac Idrovo (2020) 
 Dios subió a su trono (2021) Jaime Murrell tribute 
 Tu Santo nombre (2021) 
 Latido de mi corazón featuting Fernando Pinillos  (2021) 
 Aun si no lo haces (2021)

References

External links 

 http://alexispoficial.tk/

1984 births
Living people
Colombian performers of Christian music
21st-century Colombian male singers
Colombian Christians
Colombian singer-songwriters
Spanish-language singers
People from Santander Department